Phenylpropene is the organic compound with the formula C6H5CH2CH=CH2. It is a colorless liquid.  The compound consists of a phenyl group attached to allyl.  Phenylpropene isomerizes to trans-propenylbenzene.

In plant biochemistry, the phenylpropene skeleton is the parent (simplest representation) of the phenylpropanoids. Prominent derivatives include eugenol, safrole, and many others.

References

External links